Eve Hewson (born Memphis Eve Sunny Day Iris Hewson; 7 July 1991) is an Irish actress, whose father is the singer Bono. Her first major role was in the 2011 drama film This Must Be the Place, and she made her television debut as Nurse Lucy Elkins in the 2014 Steven Soderbergh series The Knick. She has appeared in films such as Blood Ties (2013), Bridge of Spies (2015), and Robin Hood (2018). In 2020, she starred in the miniseries The Luminaries. In 2021 she starred as Adele in the Netflix miniseries Behind Her Eyes, then in 2022 she played Becka in the Apple TV+ series Bad Sisters.

Early life
Hewson was born in Dublin, Ireland, the second daughter of activist Ali Hewson (née Alison Stewart) and U2 lead singer Bono (Paul David Matthew Hewson). Her name is derived from her time and date of birth (7 am on 7 July), as "eve" is the middle of the word "seven". She has an older sister, Jordan, and two younger brothers, Elijah and John. She was educated at the Dalkey School Project and St. Andrew's College in Dublin and New York University. The U2 song "Kite" was inspired by a moment when Bono took a kite up on Killiney Hill with Hewson and her sister, but the kite blew away and smashed.

Career
Although Hewson's parents were against her performing, she made her acting debut in 2005 alongside her sister Jordan in the short film Lost and Found. She made her feature-length debut in 2008 in The 27 Club. The same year, Hewson took part in an acting programme at the New York Film Academy. In 2010, she appeared in the music video and accompanying short film for Irish band The Script's song "For the First Time".

She portrayed Yvonne in the 2013 thriller film Blood Ties. In July 2013, Jack Quaid and Hewson asked fans to help them fund a new film called Roadies using crowdsourcing. In September of that year, she appeared in the romantic comedy film Enough Said as the daughter of James Gandolfini's character Albert. In November 2013, she was nominated for the Tatler Irish Woman of the Year Award for her work in films.

From 2014 to 2015, she co-starred in Steven Soderbergh's Cinemax TV series The Knick.

In October 2015, she appeared as Carol Donovan in Steven Spielberg's Cold War movie Bridge of Spies. She portrays the daughter of the film's main character, played by Tom Hanks.

She played Maid Marian in the Otto Bathurst version of Robin Hood, released in November 2018, and starring Taron Egerton, Jamie Foxx, and Jamie Dornan.

In August 2019, it was announced Hewson had been cast in the role of Adele on the Netflix psychological thriller miniseries Behind Her Eyes, which premiered in 2021.

In 2020, she starred as Anna Wetherell in the drama The Luminaries. Broadcast on BBC One in June, it was based on Eleanor Catton's 2013 novel, set in New Zealand during the gold rush of 1866, and also starred French actress Eva Green. She plays Anna Wetherell, a young woman who migrates to the country's South Island and is soon trafficked into the sex trade.

Personal life
Hewson lives in Williamsburg, Brooklyn. She graduated from New York University on 22 May 2013; her father, Bono, declined an honorary Doctorate of Humane Letters from NYU on the same day.

She has stated: "I don't get handed money—and I never will. I have to work!", and "I get called Memphis Eve, but my first name is Eve. I know Memphis is in there somewhere, but on my passport I'm Eve Sunny Day Hewson".

Hewson dated One Tree Hill actor James Lafferty from 2010 to 2015.

Filmography

Film

Television

Music videos

Awards

References

External links

1991 births
21st-century Irish actresses
Bono
Irish expatriates in the United States
Irish film actresses
Living people
New York Film Academy alumni
New York University alumni
People educated at St Andrew's College, Dublin
Actresses from Dublin (city)
Irish television actresses